Hacen Mefti (born 3 July 1937) was the Algerian minister for energy. He is a graduate of Dresden University and a former official with SONATRACH.

References 

Living people
Algerian politicians
1937 births
Place of birth missing (living people)
21st-century Algerian people